Jenderal Besar Soedirman Airport, also known as JB Soedirman Airport  is an airport located in Purbalingga Regency, Central Java, Indonesia.

The site used to be an Indonesian Airforce airfield, serving civil aviation since 2007. The base was officially renamed in 2016 after General Sudirman, who is a National Hero of Indonesia. The airport serves 6 regencies: Banyumas Regency, Purbalingga Regency, Banjarnegara Regency, Kebumen Regency, Wonosobo Regency and Pemalang Regency. Operation started on June 1, 2021 and the first commercial flight was on June 3. The airport is operated by PT Angkasa Pura II.

Facilities
Around 850 meters of existing grass airstrip was extended with hard pavement for the development of the airport. The airport will have a total area of 115 hectares. The runway extends 1,600 x 30 metres, aided by an apron of 69 x 103 metres, and a taxiway 15 metres in width, which was finished in early 2021. The airport can accommodate a twin-propeller aircraft such as ATR 72-600 models. Since the planned permanent structure of the terminal building is still under construction, a 20 x 20 metre, high-grade pole tent was built to serve as temporary terminal, complete with air conditioning and plumbing.

Airlines and destinations

References

Airports in Central Java